John Bowler may refer to:
John Bowler (actor) (born 1952), English actor
John Bowler (politician) (born 1949), Western Australian politician
John Bowler (businessman) (born 1937), English football chairman
John Andrew Bowler (1862–1935), American educator and minister

See also 
Bowler (surname)
Bowler (disambiguation)